is an anime television series produced by Yokohama Animation Laboratory and Graphinica, based on the video game Legend of Mana by Square Enix. The series aired from October to December 2022.

Characters

Production
The anime was announced in June 2021 by Square Enix during a 30th anniversary livestream for the Mana video game series. The anime was animated by Yokohama Animation Laboratory and Graphinica, with Warner Bros. Japan producing the series. The project began after a Warner Bros. employee approached Masaru Oyamada, the producer of the Mana video games, and delivered a "passionate" pitch for a Legend of Mana adaptation. This in turn was what led to the development of a remaster of the Legend of Mana video game. The series was written and directed by Masato Jinbo, with character designs handled by Taro Ikegami based on the original designs by HACCAN, and music composed by Yoko Shimomura. The series aired from October 8 to December 24, 2022, on the Super Animeism block on MBS, TBS, and other networks. Saori Hayami performed the opening theme song "Tear of Will" composed by Kevin Penkin. Crunchyroll licensed the series.

Episode list

Notes

References

External links
 

2022 anime television series debuts
Anime television series based on video games
Animeism
Crunchyroll anime
Dentsu
Graphinica
Mana (series)
Muse Communication
Yokohama Animation Laboratory